The Church of the Virgin Hodegetria was a 14th-century Serbian Orthodox church in Mušutište, near Suva Reka, Kosovo,. The church was destroyed by Kosovar Albanian forces during the destruction of the Serbian part of Mušutište, after the end of the Kosovo war in 1999.

History
The church was built as an endowment by Serbian nobleman Jovan Dragoslav in 1315. The inscription at the entrance of the church was considered one of the oldest and most accomplished Serbian epigraphic texts of its kind. It was an inscribed-cross church with a semi-dome and a semi-round apse. The wall was built of alternating rows of bricks and stone cubes. The frescoes of the Mušutište School, related to the style of the Palaiologos era, were painted between 1316 and 1320 and were famed for their plasticity and the saints' typology were known as the best examples of Serbian art.

In the altar area there was a unique portrait of St Clement of Ohrid. In the north-western corner of the naos there were figures of holy women, the warrior saints Theodore Tyro and Theodore Stratelates, angels, and St Panteleimon. Two throne icons of Christ and The Holy Virgin dated back to the year 1603.

Protection 
The church was designed a monument of culture on 27 November 1948. It was inscribed in the list of the Monuments of Culture of Exceptional Importance in 1990 upon the decision of the Assembly of Serbia.

See also
Monument of Culture of Exceptional Importance
Serbs in Kosovo

Notes

References

Sources

Cultural Monuments of Exceptional Importance (Serbia)
14th-century Serbian Orthodox church buildings
Destroyed churches in Kosovo
Medieval Serbian sites in Kosovo
1315 establishments in Europe
Suva Reka